Rhostyllen (Ross-tuth-l'n) was a minor railway station of the Great Western Railway, located on the Rhos Branch just off the Shrewsbury to Chester Line a couple of miles south of Wrexham in Wales. Rhostyllen was a mining area and the rail-served Bersham Colliery was just to the south.

According to the Official Handbook of Stations the following classes of traffic were being handled at this station in 1956: G & P† and there was no crane. It is curious that parcels and miscellaneous traffic was still being handled here at that date, twenty five years after the station had closed to passengers.

References

Neighbouring stations

External links
 Site of Rhostyllen station on navigable 1946 O.S. map (The station had closed by this time)

Disused railway stations in Wrexham County Borough
Former Great Western Railway stations
Railway stations in Great Britain opened in 1901
Railway stations in Great Britain closed in 1931